Botiz is a commune of 4,698 inhabitants situated in Satu Mare County, Romania. It is composed of a single village, Botiz. Until 2004, it also included Agriș and Ciuperceni villages, but these were split off that year to form Agriș Commune.

East of Botiz, there is a medium-wave broadcasting station with two 139-metre-tall guyed masts.

Demographics
Ethnic groups (2011 census): 
Romanians (71.4%)
Hungarians (22.5%)
Roma people (4.7%)

References

Communes in Satu Mare County